Vasileios Angelis known professionally as Vasilis Angelis is a Greek composer, engineer and producer of Εlectronic, Ethnic and Orchestral music.

Vasilis Angelis is from Trikala Thessaly, Greece, has collaborated with respected musicians and engineers in Greece and UK and is known for using odd rhythms with electronic and orchestral-traditional instruments.

Discography

Studio albums
 Amalgama (2010)
 Memoria De Profundis (2013)
 Seven (2016)
 Chronomorph (2022)

References

External links 
 Official website

1980 births
Living people
Greek composers
People from Trikala